Severed is an action-adventure video game developed and published by DrinkBox Studios for the PlayStation Vita, iOS, Wii U, Nintendo 3DS and Nintendo Switch. It was released on April 26, 2016, in North America and Europe for the PlayStation Vita and it was released on Wii U and iOS on September 22, 2016. It was released on Nintendo 3DS in Europe on September 22, 2016, North America on October 13, 2016. It was released in Japan on December 28, 2016.

Development 

On April 14, 2014, DrinkBox Studios announced Severed in association with video game blog Destructoid. Because of its heavy focus on touchscreen controls, Severed was anticipated as a game for mobile devices, though DrinkBox Studios was considering versions for other devices like the PlayStation Vita, the Nintendo 3DS and the Wii U, too. Motion-sensing technologies like PlayStation Move and Kinect were considered. However, the developers did not confirm the game for any of these platforms at that time. DrinkBox Studios was aiming for a release of Severed in 2015. At the PlayStation Experience 2014 in December, DrinkBox Studios announced that Severed would be released on PlayStation Vita, continuing the trend of DrinkBox' previous games of releasing on PlayStation platforms first. After being delayed, DrinkBox Studios announced on April 11, 2016, that Severed would be released for PlayStation Vita on April 26.

On June 13, 2016, during the Electronic Entertainment Expo 2016, Severed was announced for both the Wii U and Nintendo 3DS. The game supports cross-buy, so if a user buys it on the Wii U, they also get the game free on the 3DS. The Nintendo Switch version released on August 8, 2017.

Music 

The soundtrack for Severed was created as a collaboration between the Juno and Polaris-nominated band Yamantaka // Sonic Titan and Pantayo, and was created with the support of FACTOR and the Canadian Government. Severed's soundtrack took home an award for Best Musical Score from the Canadian Videogame Awards

Reception 

The game received "generally favorable" reviews, according to video game review aggregator Metacritic. It was named Apple's 2016 iPad Game of the Year.

References

External links 

 

2016 video games
Action-adventure games
Apple Design Awards recipients
DrinkBox Studios games
Flyhigh Works games
Indie video games
IOS games
Nintendo 3DS eShop games
Nintendo Switch games
PlayStation Vita games
Single-player video games
Video games developed in Canada
Video games featuring female protagonists
Wii U eShop games